The 2010–11 Atlanta Hawks season was the 62nd season of the Atlanta Hawks franchise in the National Basketball Association (NBA), and the 43rd in Atlanta.

Key dates
 June 24 – The 2010 NBA draft was held in New York City.
 July 1 – The free agency period began.

Draft picks

Roster

Pre-season

Game log

|- bgcolor="#ffcccc"
| 1
| October 7
| Memphis
| 
| Jeff Teague (20)
| Marvin Williams (10)
| Jeff Teague (6)
| Philips Arena7,132
| 0–1
|- bgcolor="#ffcccc"
| 2
| October 11
| @ Detroit
| 
| Jordan Crawford (20)
| Josh Smith (7)
| Jordan Crawford (7)
| The Palace of Auburn Hills10,591
| 0–2
|- bgcolor="#ffcccc"
| 3
| October 12
| @ Washington
| 
| Jordan Crawford (30)
| Zaza Pachulia (6)
| Jordan Crawford (5)
| Verizon Center9,230
| 0–3
|- bgcolor="#ccffcc"
| 4
| October 16
| @ New Orleans
| 
| Joe Johnson (22)
| Al Horford (9)
| Jamal Crawford (5)
| Mountain States Health Alliance Athletic Center5,933
| 1–3
|- bgcolor="#ffcccc"
| 5
| October 18
| Orlando
| 
| Josh Powell (13)
| Josh Smith (7)
| Joe Johnson (4)
| Philips Arena7,571
| 1–4
|- bgcolor="#ccffcc"
| 6
| October 21
| Miami
| 
| Joe Johnson (27)
| Marvin Williams (11)
| Joe Johnson (6)
| Philips Arena15,197
| 2–4
|- bgcolor="#ffcccc"
| 7
| October 22
| @ Charlotte
| 
| Jamal Crawford (15)
| Josh Powell (8)
| Jamal Crawford (4)
| Time Warner Cable Arena8,849
| 2–5
|-

Regular season

Standings

Record vs. opponents

Game log

|- bgcolor="#ccffcc"
| 1
| October 27
| @ Memphis
| 
| Joe Johnson (22)
| Zaza Pachulia (11)
| Joe Johnson (7)
| FedExForum17,519
| 1–0
|- bgcolor="#ccffcc"
| 2
| October 29    
| @ Philadelphia
| 
| Joe Johnson (22)
| Al Horford (12)
| Mike Bibby (6)
| Wells Fargo Center10,960
| 2–0
|- bgcolor="#ccffcc"
| 3
| October 30
| Washington
| 
| Joe Johnson (25)
| Josh Smith,Al Horford (10)
| Mike Bibby (4)
| Philips Arena18,729
| 3–0
|-

|- bgcolor="#ccffcc"
| 4
| November 2
| @ Cleveland
| 
| Marvin Williams (22)
| Al Horford (12)
| Joe Johnson (9)
| Quicken Loans Arena20,562
| 4–0
|- bgcolor="#ccffcc"
| 5
| November 3
| Detroit
| 
| Josh Smith (22)
| Josh Smith (11)
| Joe Johnson (8)
| Philips Arena13,003
| 5–0
|- bgcolor="#ccffcc"
| 6
| November 5
| @ Minnesota
| 
| Josh Smith,Jamal Crawford (20)
| Al Horford (12)
| Josh Smith (6)
| Target Center17,222
| 6–0
|- bgcolor="#ffcccc"
| 7
| November 7
| Phoenix
| 
| Joe Johnson (34)
| Al Horford (10)
| Joe Johnson (6)
| Philips Arena13,395
| 6–1
|- bgcolor="#ffcccc"
| 8
| November 8
| @ Orlando
| 
| Joe Johnson (23)
| Josh Smith (13)
| Josh Smith (6)
| Amway Center18,846
| 6–2
|- bgcolor="#ffcccc"
| 9
| November 10
| Milwaukee
| 
| Zaza Pachulia (16)
| Josh Smith (8)
| Jamal Crawford (5)
| Philips Arena11,211
| 6–3
|- bgcolor="#ffcccc"
| 10
| November 12
| Utah
| 
| Joe Johnson (23)
| Josh Smith (13)
| Al Horford,Josh Smith (5)
| Philips Arena17,069
| 6–4
|- bgcolor="#ccffcc"
| 11
| November 14
| Minnesota
| 
| Al Horford (28)
| Al Horford,Josh Smith (10)
| Joe Johnson (5)
| Philips Arena12,027
| 7–4
|- bgcolor="#ccffcc"
| 12
| November 16
| @ Indiana
| 
| Josh Smith (25)
| Josh Smith (8)
| Mike Bibby (7)
| Conseco Fieldhouse11,133
| 8–4
|- bgcolor="#ffcccc"
| 13
| November 20
| Dallas
| 
| Josh Smith (21)
| Al Horford (20)
| Jamal Crawford (7)
| Philips Arena14,143
| 8–5
|- bgcolor="#ffcccc"
| 14
| November 22
| Boston
| 
| Mike Bibby (11)
| Jordan Crawford (7)
| Jamal Crawford (6)
| Philips Arena14,476
| 8–6
|- bgcolor="#ffcccc"
| 15
| November 23
| @ New Jersey
| 
| Jamal Crawford (21)
| Al Horford (10)
| Joe Johnson (8)
| Prudential Center13,010
| 8–7
|- bgcolor="#ccffcc"
| 16
| November 25
| Washington
| 
| Joe Johnson (21)
| Josh Smith (14)
| Mike Bibby (6)
| Philips Arena15,042
| 9–7
|- bgcolor="#ccffcc"
| 17
| November 27
| @ New York
| 
| Jamal Crawford (21)
| Joe Johnson (10)
| Joe Johnson (7)
| Madison Square Garden19,763
| 10–7
|- bgcolor="#ccffcc"
| 18
| November 28
| @ Toronto
| 
| Marvin Williams (17)
| Josh Smith (13)
| Josh Smith (10)
| Air Canada Centre17,302
| 11–7
|-

|- bgcolor="#ccffcc"
| 19
| December 1
| Memphis
| 
| Al Horford (20)
| Josh Smith (8)
| Jamal Crawford (8)
| Philips Arena11,513
| 12–7
|- bgcolor="#ccffcc"
| 20
| December 3
| Philadelphia
| 
| Marvin Williams (22)
| Al Horford (13)
| Al Horford (6)
| Philips Arena12,140
| 13–7
|- bgcolor="#ffcccc"
| 21
| December 4
| @ Miami
| 
| Al Horford (22)
| Al Horford (9)
| Mike Bibby (6)
| American Airlines Arena19,600
| 13–8
|- bgcolor="#ccffcc"
| 22
| December 6
| @ Orlando
| 
| Josh Smith (19)
| Josh Smith (13)
| Mike Bibby (7)
| Amway Center18,846
| 14–8
|- bgcolor="#ccffcc"
| 23
| December 7
| New Jersey
| 
| Josh Smith (34)
| Al Horford (10)
| Josh Smith (7)
| Philips Arena14,273
| 15–8
|- bgcolor="#ffcccc"
| 24
| December 10
| @ San Antonio
| 
| Jamal Crawford (23)
| Al Horford (9)
| Jamal Crawford,Josh Smith (5)
| AT&T Center17,576
| 15–9
|- bgcolor="#ccffcc"
| 25
| December 11
| Indiana
| 
| Josh Smith (21)
| Al Horford (16)
| Al Horford (8)
| Philips Arena14,131
| 16–9
|- bgcolor="#ffcccc"
| 26
| December 14
| @ Detroit
| 
| Josh Smith (26)
| Al Horford (12)
| Mike Bibby (6)
| The Palace of Auburn Hills12,526
| 16–10
|- bgcolor="#ffcccc"
| 27
| December 16
| @ Boston
| 
| Marvin Williams (26)
| Al Horford (7)
| Mike Bibby (8)
| TD Garden18,624
| 16–11
|- bgcolor="#ccffcc"
| 28
| December 17
| Charlotte
| 
| Joe Johnson,Al Horford,Marvin Williams (16)
| Josh Smith (11)
| Joe Johnson (8)
| Philips Arena15,006
| 17–11
|- bgcolor="#ffcccc"
| 29
| December 19
| @ New Jersey
| 
| Mike Bibby (19)
| Al Horford,Josh Smith (10)
| Joe Johnson (6)
| Prudential Center11,295
| 17–12
|- bgcolor="#ccffcc"
| 30
| December 20
| Orlando
| 
| Al Horford (24)
| Al Horford (11)
| Joe Johnson (6)
| Philips Arena16,275
| 18–12
|- bgcolor="#ccffcc"
| 31
| December 22
| Cleveland
| 
| Joe Johnson (23)
| Josh Smith (11)
| Joe Johnson (7)
| Philips Arena12,610
| 19–12
|- bgcolor="#ffcccc"
| 32
| December 26
| @ New Orleans
| 
| Joe Johnson (23)
| Josh Smith (12)
| Mike Bibby (5)
| New Orleans Arena15,626
| 19–13
|- bgcolor="#ccffcc"
| 33
| December 27
| @ Milwaukee
| 
| Al Horford (18)
| Jason Collins,Al Horford (12)
| Joe Johnson (6)
| Bradley Center16,751
| 20–13
|- bgcolor="#ccffcc"
| 34
| December 29
| Golden State
| 
| Josh Smith (22)
| Al Horford (15)
| Joe Johnson (8)
| Philips Arena15,925
| 21–13
|- bgcolor="#ffcccc"
| 35
| December 31
| @ Oklahoma City
| 
| Jamal Crawford (26)
| Josh Smith (9)
| Joe Johnson (11)
| Oklahoma City Arena18,203
| 21–14
|-

|- bgcolor="#ccffcc"
| 36
| January 2
| @ L.A. Clippers
| 
| Joe Johnson (29)
| Al Horford,Josh Smith (10)
| Mike Bibby,Jamal Crawford,Joe Johnson (4)
| Staples Center16,750
| 22–14
|- bgcolor="#ccffcc"
| 37
| January 4
| @ Sacramento
| 
| Jamal Crawford (31)
| Josh Smith (11)
| Jamal Crawford (7)
| ARCO Arena11,472
| 23–14
|- bgcolor="#ccffcc"
| 38
| January 5
| @ Utah
| 
| Joe Johnson (28)
| Al Horford (8)
| Mike Bibby (8)
| EnergySolutions Arena19,911
| 24–14
|- bgcolor="#ccffcc"
| 39
| January 8
| Indiana
| 
| Josh Smith (27)
| Al Horford,Josh Smith (10)
| Al Horford,Joe Johnson,Josh Smith (6)
| Philips Arena13,547
| 25–14
|- bgcolor="#ccffcc"
| 40
| January 12
| @ Toronto
| 
| Jamal Crawford (36)
| Al Horford (13)
| Mike Bibby,Josh Smith (4)
| Air Canada Centre14,186
| 26–14
|- bgcolor="#ffcccc"
| 41
| January 15
| Houston
| 
| Joe Johnson (30)
| Josh Smith (12)
| Al Horford (8)
| Philips Arena13,420
| 26–15
|- bgcolor="#ccffcc"
| 42
| January 17
| Sacramento
| 
| Joe Johnson (36)
| Josh Smith (10)
| Jamal Crawford (7)
| Philips Arena14,820
| 27–15
|- bgcolor="#ccffcc"
| 43
| January 18
| @ Miami
| 
| Jamal Crawford,Joe Johnson (19)
| Josh Smith (12)
| Joe Johnson (10)
| American Airlines Arena19,600
| 28–15
|- bgcolor="#ffcccc"
| 44
| January 21
| New Orleans
| 
| Jamal Crawford (14)
| Josh Smith (8)
| Joe Johnson,Jeff Teague (3)
| Philips Arena14,875
| 28–16
|- bgcolor="#ccffcc"
| 45
| January 22
| @ Charlotte
| 
| Joe Johnson (32)
| Mike Bibby,Zaza Pachulia (8)
| Joe Johnson (5)
| Time Warner Cable Arena17,286
| 29–16
|- bgcolor="#ffcccc"
| 46
| January 26
| @ Milwaukee
| 
| Jamal Crawford (20)
| Josh Smith (11)
| Al Horford (5)
| Bradley Center13,274
| 29–17
|- bgcolor="#ccffcc"
| 47
| January 28
| New York
| 
| Joe Johnson (34)
| Al Horford (14)
| Joe Johnson (7)
| Philips Arena19,069
| 30–17
|- bgcolor="#ffcccc"
| 48
| January 29
| @ Dallas
| 
| Joe Johnson (27)
| Al Horford (9)
| Joe Johnson (6)
| American Airlines Center20,309
| 30–18
|-

|- bgcolor="#ccffcc"
| 49
| February 2
| Toronto
| 
| Joe Johnson (37)
| Al Horford (14)
| Joe Johnson (8)
| Philips Arena14,025
| 31–18
|- bgcolor="#ccffcc"
| 50
| February 4
| L.A. Clippers
| 
| Jamal Crawford (34)
| Al Horford (12)
| Joe Johnson (9)
| Philips Arena19,363
| 32–18
|- bgcolor="#ccffcc"
| 51
| February 5
| @ Washington
| 
| Josh Smith (29)
| Josh Smith (16)
| Jamal Crawford (5)
| Verizon Center16,256
| 33–18
|- bgcolor="#ffcccc"
| 52
| February 8
| Philadelphia
| 
| Josh Smith (16)
| Marvin Williams (10)
| Josh Smith (7)
| Philips Arena12,903
| 33–19
|- bgcolor="#ffcccc"
| 53
| February 12
| Charlotte
| 
| Josh Smith (28)
| Al Horford (10)
| Jamal Crawford (7)
| Philips Arena16,948
| 33–20
|- bgcolor="#ccffcc"
| 54
| February 14
| @ Detroit
| 
| Josh Smith (27)
| Josh Smith (14)
| Mike Bibby (7)
| The Palace of Auburn Hills11,844
| 34–20
|- bgcolor="#ffcccc"
| 55
| February 16
| @ New York
| 
| Marvin Williams (17)
| Al Horford (11)
| Joe Johnson (6)
| Madison Square Garden19,763
| 34–21
|- align="center"
|colspan="9" bgcolor="#bbcaff"|All-Star Break
|- bgcolor="#ffcccc"
| 56
| February 22
| @ L.A. Lakers
| 
| Joe Johnson (14)
| Al Horford,Josh Smith (6)
| Joe Johnson (4)
| Staples Center18,997
| 34–22
|- bgcolor="#ffcccc"
| 57
| February 23
| @ Phoenix
| 
| Josh Smith (26)
| Al Horford (9)
| Al Horford,Josh Smith (4)
| US Airways Center18,254
| 34–23
|- bgcolor="#ccffcc"
| 58
| February 25
| @ Golden State
| 
| Josh Smith (26)
| Al Horford (13)
| Al Horford (7)
| Oracle Arena19,858
| 35–23
|- bgcolor="#ccffcc"
| 59
| February 27
| @ Portland
| 
| Jamal Crawford (23)
| Zaza Pachulia (12)
| Josh Smith (4)
| Rose Garden20,642
| 36–23
|- bgcolor="#ffcccc"
| 60
| February 28
| @ Denver
| 
| Joe Johnson (22)
| Al Horford (16)
| Al Horford (4)
| Pepsi Center16,163
| 36–24
|-

|- bgcolor="#ccffcc"
| 61
| March 2
| Chicago
| 
| Al Horford (31)
| Al Horford (16)
| Joe Johnson (9)
| Philips Arena16,928
| 37–24
|- bgcolor="#ffcccc"
| 62
| March 4
| Oklahoma City
| 
| Joe Johnson (24)
| Al Horford (12)
| Jamal Crawford (5)
| Philips Arena17,916
| 37–25
|- bgcolor="#ffcccc"
| 63
| March 6
| New York
| 
| Josh Smith (17)
| Josh Smith (11)
| Al Horford (5)
| Philips Arena19,560
| 37–26
|- bgcolor="#ffcccc"
| 64
| March 8
| L.A. Lakers
| 
| Al Horford (17)
| Zaza Pachulia (10)
| Josh Smith (6)
| Philips Arena19,890
| 37–27
|- bgcolor="#ffcccc"
| 65
| March 11
| @ Chicago
| 
| Joe Johnson (16)
| Al Horford (7)
| Al Horford (5)
| United Center22,123
| 37–28
|- bgcolor="#ccffcc"
| 66
| March 12
| Portland
| 
| Jeff Teague (24)
| Josh Smith (12)
| Josh Smith (6)
| Philips Arena15,522
| 38–28
|- bgcolor="#ccffcc"
| 67
| March 15
| Milwaukee
| 
| Joe Johnson (36)
| Josh Smith (14)
| Jamal Crawford (8)
| Philips Arena13,590
| 39–28
|- bgcolor="#ffcccc"
| 68
| March 16
| Denver
| 
| Zaza Pachulia (19)
| Zaza Pachulia (10)
| Al Horford (6)
| Philips Arena14,669
| 39–29
|- bgcolor="#ffcccc"
| 69
| March 18
| Miami
| 
| Marvin Williams (15)
| Joe Johnson,Zaza Pachulia (5)
| Jeff Teague (6)
| Philips Arena20,024
| 39–30
|- bgcolor="#ccffcc"
| 70
| March 20
| Detroit
| 
| Al Horford (18)
| Al Horford (10)
| Joe Johnson (8)
| Philips Arena17,580
| 40–30
|- bgcolor="#ffcccc"
| 71
| March 22
| Chicago
| 
| Jeff Teague (20)
| Joe Johnson (5)
| Kirk Hinrich (5)
| Philips Arena18,203
| 40–31
|- bgcolor="#ffcccc"
| 72
| March 23
| @ Philadelphia
| 
| Josh Smith (30)
| Josh Smith (12)
| Kirk Hinrich (8)
| Wells Fargo Center15,199
| 40–32
|- bgcolor="#ccffcc"
| 73
| March 26
| New Jersey
| 
| Al Horford (23)
| Al Horford (12)
| Jamal Crawford (6)
| Philips Arena17,093
| 41–32
|- bgcolor="#ccffcc"
| 74
| March 27
| @ Cleveland
| 
| Marvin Williams (31)
| Josh Smith (18)
| Josh Smith (8)
| Quicken Loans Arena20,226
| 42–32
|- bgcolor="#ccffcc"
| 75
| March 30
| Orlando
| 
| Josh Smith (26)
| Al Horford (9)
| Kirk Hinrich,Al Horford (5)
| Philips Arena15,114
| 43–32
|-

|- bgcolor="#ccffcc"
| 76
| April 1
| Boston
| 
| Jamal Crawford (20)
| Al Horford (15)
| Jamal Crawford,Al Horford (4)
| Philips Arena19,763
| 44–32
|- bgcolor="#ffcccc"
| 77
| April 3
| @ Houston
| 
| Joe Johnson (25)
| Josh Smith (11)
| Joe Johnson,Josh Smith (7)
| Toyota Center15,993
| 44–33
|- bgcolor="#ffcccc"
| 78
| April 5
| San Antonio
| 
| Joe Johnson (21)
| Al Horford (9)
| Al Horford (5)
| Philips Arena17,277
| 44–34
|- bgcolor="#ffcccc"
| 79
| April 8
| @ Indiana
| 
| Jeff Teague (21)
| Zaza Pachulia (11)
| Jamal Crawford (3)
| Conseco Fieldhouse15,879
| 44–35
|- bgcolor="#ffcccc"
| 80
| April 9
| @ Washington
| 
| Al Horford (21)
| Al Horford (10)
| Jeff Teague (5)
| Verizon Center19,771
| 44–36
|- bgcolor="#ffcccc"
| 81
| April 11
| Miami
| 
| Josh Smith (17)
| Al Horford,Josh Smith (6)
| Joe Johnson (5)
| Philips Arena18,529
| 44–37
|- bgcolor="#ffcccc"
| 82
| April 13
| @ Charlotte
| 
| Josh Powell (16)
| Zaza Pachulia (10)
| Jamal Crawford,Kirk Hinrich,Zaza Pachulia,Pape Sy,Damien Wilkins,Marvin Williams (2)
| Time Warner Cable Arena16,138
| 44–38
|-

Playoffs

Game log

|- bgcolor=ccffcc
| 1
| April 16
| @ Orlando
| 
| Joe Johnson (25)
| Josh Smith (8)
| Jamal Crawford,Joe Johnson (5)
| Amway Center19,108
| 1–0
|- bgcolor=ffcccc
| 2
| April 19
| @ Orlando
| 
| Jamal Crawford (25)
| Al Horford (10)
| Joe Johnson (5)
| Amway Center19,160
| 1–1
|- bgcolor=ccffcc
| 3
| April 22
| Orlando
| 
| Jamal Crawford (23)
| Josh Smith (10)
| Joe Johnson (5)
| Philips Arena19,865
| 2–1
|- bgcolor=ccffcc
| 4
| April 24
| Orlando
| 
| Jamal Crawford (25)
| Al Horford (12)
| Jamal Crawford (6)
| Philips Arena19,490
| 3–1
|- bgcolor=ffcccc
| 5
| April 26
| @ Orlando
| 
| Josh Smith (22)
| Al Horford (14)
| Al Horford (6)
| Amway Center19,091
| 3–2
|- bgcolor=ccffcc
| 6
| April 28
| Orlando
| 
| Joe Johnson (23)
| Al Horford (12)
| Al Horford (6)
| Philips Arena19,282
| 4–2

|- bgcolor=ccffcc
| 1
| May 2
| @ Chicago
| 
| Joe Johnson (34)
| Al Horford (13)
| Jeff Teague (5)
| United Center22,890
| 1–0
|- bgcolor=ffcccc
| 2
| May 4
| @ Chicago
| 
| Jeff Teague (21)
| Al Horford (14)
| Al Horford (6)
| United Center22,872
| 1–1
|- bgcolor=ffcccc
| 3
| May 6
| Chicago
| 
| Jeff Teague (21)
| Josh Smith (13)
| Josh Smith (4)
| Philips Arena19,521
| 1–2
|- bgcolor=ccffcc
| 4
| May 8
| Chicago
| 
| Joe Johnson (24)
| Josh Smith (16)
| Josh Smith (8)
| Philips Arena19,263
| 2–2
|- bgcolor=ffcccc
| 5
| May 10
| @ Chicago
| 
| Jeff Teague (21)
| Al Horford (10)
| Jeff Teague (7)
| United Center22,980
| 2–3
|- bgcolor=ffcccc
| 6
| May 12
| Chicago
| 
| Joe Johnson (19)
| Zaza Pachulia (13)
| Joe Johnson (4)
| Philips Arena19,378
| 2–4

Player statistics

Season

|- align="center" bgcolor=""
| *
|| 12 || 0 || 6.3 || .500 || style="background:#C41E3A;color:white;" | 1.000 || .200 || 1.4 || 0.3 || .25 || .42 || 1.3
|- align="center" bgcolor="#f0f0f0"
| *
|| 56 || 56 || 29.9 || .435 || .441 || .630 || 2.6 || 3.6 || .70 || .10 || 9.4
|- align="center" bgcolor=""
| 
|| 49 || 28 || 12.1 || .479 || style="background:#C41E3A;color:white;" | 1.000 || .659 || 2.1 || 0.4 || .18 || .18 || 2.0
|- align="center" bgcolor="#f0f0f0"
|  || 76 || 0 || 30.2 || .421 || .341 || .854 || 1.7 || 3.2 || .75 || .18 || 14.2
|- align="center" bgcolor=""
| * || 16 || 0 || 10.0 || .351 || .333 || .667 || 1.8 || 0.9 || .20 || .0 || 4.2
|- align="center" bgcolor="#f0f0f0"
| * || 47 || 12 || 17.8 || .393 || .315 || .857 || 1.8 || 0.6 || .30 || .10 || 4.5
|- align="center" bgcolor=""
| * || 24 || 22 || 28.6 || .432 || .421 || .667 || 2.2 || 3.3 || .79 || .29 || 8.6
|- align="center" bgcolor="#f0f0f0"
| 
|| 77 || style="background:#C41E3A;color:white;" | 77 || 35.1 || style="background:#C41E3A;color:white;" | .557 || .500 || .798 || style="background:#C41E3A;color:white;" | 9.3 || 3.5 || .77 || 1.04 || 15.3
|- align="center" bgcolor=""
| 
|| 72 || 72 || style="background:#C41E3A;color:white;" | 35.5 || .443 || .297 || .802 || 4.0 || style="background:#C41E3A;color:white;" | 4.7 || .65 || .10 || style="background:#C41E3A;color:white;" | 18.2
|- align="center" bgcolor="#f0f0f0"
| 
| style="background:#C41E3A;color:white;" | 79 || 7 || 15.7 || .461 || .000 || .754 || 4.2 || 0.7 || .43 || .28 || 4.4
|- align="center" bgcolor=""
|  || 54 || 0 || 12.1 || .452 || .000 || .800 || 2.5 || 0.4 || .09 || .09 || 4.1
|- align="center" bgcolor="#f0f0f0"
| 
|| 77 || style="background:#C41E3A;color:white;" | 77 || 34.4 || .477 || .331 || .725 || 8.5 || 3.3 || style="background:#C41E3A;color:white;" | 1.29 || style="background:#C41E3A;color:white;" | 1.56 || 16.5
|- align="center" bgcolor=""
| 
|| 3 || 0 || 7.0 || .333 || .000 || style="background:#C41E3A;color:white;" | 1.000 || 1.0 || 0.7 || .33 || .0 || 2.3
|- align="center" bgcolor="#f0f0f0"
|  || 70 || 7 || 13.8 || .438 || .375 || .794 || 1.5 || 2.0 || .64 || .36 || 5.2
|- align="center" bgcolor=""
|  || 13 || 0 || 6.3 || .476 || .0 || .800 || 1.8 || 0.2 || .08 || .31 || 2.5
|- align="center" bgcolor="#f0f0f0"
|  || 52 || 0 || 13.0 || .504 || .200 || .714 || 1.7 || 0.8 || .52 || .17 || 3.5
|- align="center" bgcolor=""
| 
|| 65 || 52 || 28.7 || .458 || .336 || .845 || 4.8 || 1.4 || .52 || .35 || 10.4
|}
* – Stats with the Hawks.

Playoffs

Awards, records and milestones

Awards

All-Star
 Joe Johnson and Al Horford were selected as reserves for the Eastern Conference in the 2011 NBA All-Star Game. Johnson was selected for the fifth year in a row, while Horford received his second consecutive selection.
 Team Atlanta, consisting of current Hawks center Al Horford, Atlanta Dream guard Coco Miller, and former Hawks guard Steve Smith, won the Shooting Stars Competition on All-Star Saturday Night.

Season
 Al Horford was named to the All-NBA Third Team as center. It was his first All-NBA selection.

Transactions

Trades

Free agents

Additions

Subtractions

References

External links
 2010–11 Atlanta Hawks season at Basketball-Reference.com
 2010–11 Atlanta Hawks schedule at ESPN

Atlanta Hawks
Atlanta Hawks seasons
Atlanta Haw
Atlanta Haw